Abertridwr is a small village in the historic county of Montgomeryshire in the north of Powys and close to Lake Vyrnwy in the community (civil parish) of Llanwddyn.

It lies at the confluence of Nant Tridwr (hence the name) with the Vyrnwy river about 1 mile from the latter's exit from the lake.

The area surrounding Abertridwr has forests and is used for outdoor pursuits.

The nearest significant settlement is Welshpool, about 25 km or 15 miles to the south east.

External links 
Photos of Abertridwr and surrounding area on geograph

Villages in Powys
Llanwddyn